Gynaecworld is a women's health centre. It is located in Mumbai, India and is one of several Mumbai IVF clinics that also provides surrogacy.

The Gynaecworld clinic is founded and led by MD Dr Duru Shah

Here are some of the services available at Gynaecworld

 Obstetrics and Gynaecology consultation
 Fertility Services
 Premarital counselling
 Pre-pregnancy Counselling
 Pregnancy Care
 Antenatal exercise program
 Family Planning Services
 Endoscopy (Laparoscopy and Hysteroscopy)
 Teencare
 Dermatologist
 Dietician
 Ultrasound
 Laboratory services

See also
 Akanksha Infertility Clinic, Anand, Gujarat
 Commercial surrogacy in India

References 

Clinics in India
Healthcare in Mumbai